The 2019 I-League 2nd Division (known as Hero 2018–19 I-League 2nd Division for sponsorship reasons), was the 12th season of the I-League 2nd Division, the second division Indian football league, since its establishment in 2008. The league was played from January to April 2019.

TRAU won the title and earned the promotion to 2019–20 I-League.

Teams

Nominated teams
At the start of the season 23 teams were nominated by the state associations for participation in this edition of the league. 
Following clubs were nominated:

Kerala: SAT Tirur, Quartz FC, FC Kerala

Delhi: Hindustan FC, Sudeva Moonlight, Delhi United FC

Manipur: TRAU FC, SSU-Singjamei

Meghalaya: Langsning FC

Mizoram: Chhinga Veng

Sikkim: United Sikkim

West Bengal: Mohammedan Sporting, Rainbow AC

Jammu and Kashmir: Lonestar Kashmir FC, J&K Bank FC

Karnataka: Ozone FC, South United FC

Telangana: Fateh Hyderabad AFC

Odisha: RadhaRaman Club

Bihar: Shirsh Bihar United FC

Gujarat: ARA FC

Jharkhand: Shivansh Jharkhand FC

Madhya Pradesh: Madan Maharaj FC

Selected teams
On 7 December 2018, it was announced by the league committee that nine clubs cleared the licensing criteria and are allowed to participate in this season. Additionally TRAU F.C. were granted three days of extension to clear the club licensing, considering the situation in their state league. TRAU cleared the licensing, taking the total teams competing to sixteen.

Stadiums and locations

Personnel and kits

Coaching changes

Foreign players
Each club, excluding the Indian Super League reserve sides, can register three foreign players in their squad. One of the foreign players has to be from an AFC Member Nation.

Preliminary round

Group A

Fixtures and results

Group B

Fixtures and results

Group C

Fixtures and results

Final round
Group champions from preliminary round and second placed team from Group C will qualify for this round. The four sides will play each other twice in the home and away format. The team that finishes top of the table in the Final Round will be crowned champions, and earn promotion.

Table

Fixtures and results

Season statistics

Top scorers

Hat-tricks

Clean sheets

References

External links
 Official I-League website.

I-League 2nd Division seasons
2018–19 in Indian football leagues